Stracherite is a mineral discovered at the Hatrurim Formation in Israel, by Evgeny Galuskin of the University of Silesia in Katowice, Poland, and colleagues. The mineral has a surprising structure composed of a unique mix of elements. It is the first carbonate-bearing member of a group of very rare minerals called the nabimusaite group, named for a similar mineral that also occurs at the Haturim Formation.  Galuskin named the mineral in honor of Glenn Stracher of East Georgia State College, USA, an expert on uncontrolled coal fires.

Localities 
Israel: Hatrurim Formation, Negev

References 

Silicate minerals
Phosphate minerals
Carbonate minerals
Trigonal minerals